The Battle of Julianstown was fought on 27 November 1641 near Julianstown in County Louth during the Irish Rebellion of 1641. A force sent by the Dublin government to reinforce the garrison of Drogheda was ambushed by Irish rebels and nearly destroyed.

Background

At the beginning of the Irish Rebellion in October 1641, the rebels over ran most of Ulster before moving south towards Dublin. On 21 November, they besieged Drogheda and the Dublin government assembled reinforcements to support the garrison.

The battle
The relief force was hastily put together and its soldiers largely untrained, many being half-starved refugees from the north who had been pressed into service. The detachment was commanded by Sir Patrick Wemyss and was composed of 50 horse and around 600 foot, led by Sergeant Major Roper. The rebel forces were led by Philip O'Reilly and Miles O'Reilly, both Irish leaders from County Cavan. Their force of 3,000 men including 300 horse had experienced commanders and appears to have been assigned to the south of Drogheda to complete the encirclement of the garrison.

On the morning of the battle, the rebels became aware of the approach of the government troops and prepared an ambush. When they sprang their trap, Wemyss mistakenly ordered his men to "countermarch" which caused them to move backwards as if they were retreating. The rebels took full advantage of the situation and immediately charged, causing panic and confusion among their opponents, many of whom threw down their weapons and attempted to escape. Although the cavalry entered Drogheda along with three companies of infantry, the rest were killed or captured.

Aftermath 
The completeness of their victory was an important morale boost for the Irish troops and helped to spread the revolt throughout Ireland. For the Earl of Ormond, newly appointed commander of the government army, the battle showed the determination of the rebels and the degree of support for their cause.

See also
Irish Rebellion of 1641 
Confederate Ireland
Wars of the Three Kingdoms
Irish battles

References

Sources

Further reading
Lenihan, Pádraig (2001). Confederate Catholics at War, 1641-49, Cork University Press, .
Clarke, Aidan (2000) The Old English in Ireland, 1625-1642 Four Courts Press, pp. 176–177.

Irish Rebellion of 1641
Battles of the Irish Confederate Wars
History of County Meath
Military history of Ireland
Battles involving Ireland